Apache Drums is a 1951 American Western film directed by Hugo Fregonese and produced by Val Lewton. The drama features Stephen McNally, Coleen Gray, and Willard Parker. The film was based on an original story: Stand at Spanish Boot, by Harry Brown.  Apache Drums was the last film Val Lewton produced before his death.

Plot
A notorious gambler is thrown out of a small town named Spanish Boot, but he quickly returns when he discovers the town is threatened by the Mescalero Apaches led by Chief Victorio.

Cast
 Stephen McNally as Sam Leeds
 Coleen Gray as Sally
 Willard Parker as Joe Madden
 Arthur Shields as Reverend Griffin
 James Griffith as Lt. Glidden
 Armando Silvestre as Pedro-Peter
 Georgia Backus as Mrs. Keon
 Clarence Muse as Jehu
 Ruthelma Stevens as Betty Careless
 James Best as Bert Keon
 Chinto Guzman as Chacho
 Ray Bennett as Mr. Keon

Reception
When the film was released The New York Times gave the film a mixed review and wrote, "Apache Drums is tense and exciting fare when its green and red-painted Indians, yelping and keening, ride to attack or literally bite the dust with authentic thuds. When it is loquaciously appraising its principals, it is, to quote one of them, 'kind of dull and tame.'"

Recently, film critic Dennis Schwartz reviewed the film favorably, writing, "It's the kind of effective kickass B western where the cavalry comes in the nick of time to rescue the white folks from the attacking Indians. Director Hugo Fregonese (Untamed Frontier) gives a nod to Lewton's eye for detail and shadowy photography...David Chandler turns in a crisp screenplay that's always tense and filled with exciting action sequences except when he keeps things too chatty, which tamps down the narrative with a dull soap opera romantic feud...Pretty darn good stuff for such a modest western, showing that it takes all kinds to be brave and that the worst situation might bring out the best in a man."

Time Out London's review was also complimentary, writing, "Beautifully staged by Fregonese, especially the climactic attack on the church where the survivors make their stand, with painted Apaches erupting through the high windows like demons from hell. Val Lewton's last production, it is full of touches instantly recognisable from his RKO series: the subtle ambivalence undermining attitudes and ethical principles, the generous stance against racism, the concern for childhood (the gambler distracts the frightened kids with an exhibition of sleight of hand), the love of traditional songs (the kids led into a chorus of 'Oranges and Lemons'; the minister countering the Apache chanting by launching into 'The Men of Harlech')."

References

External links
 
 
 
 

1951 films
1950s historical films
1951 Western (genre) films
American historical films
American Western (genre) films
Western (genre) cavalry films
Apache Wars films
1950s English-language films
Films based on American novels
Films based on Western (genre) novels
Films directed by Hugo Fregonese
Films produced by Val Lewton
Films set in the 1880s
Films shot in California
Universal Pictures films
Films scored by Hans J. Salter
1950s American films